The House of Óengus is a proposed dynasty that may have ruled as Kings of the Picts and possibly of all of northern Great Britain, for approximately a century from the 730s to the 830s AD. Their first ruler of Pictland was the great Óengus I of the Picts, who may be the figure carved into the St Andrews Sarcophagus pictured on the right.

Origins and identity
Early (but not contemporary) Irish genealogies make Óengus a member of the Eóganachta of Munster, as a descendant of Coirpre Cruithnechán or "Cairbre the little Pict", a legendary emanation or double of Coirpre Luachra mac Cuirc, son of Conall Corc, and ancestor of the Eóganacht Locha Léin, rulers of the kingdom of Iarmuman. An early cycle of tales have Conall Corc traveling to Pictland early in his career, and there taking the daughter of the Pictish king as his first wife, hence Coirpre's epithet. The branch of the kindred, called in the annals the Eoghanachta Magh Geirginn, from which he came were said to be located in an area known as Circinn, usually associated with modern Angus and the Mearns. The genealogy appears in the Rawlinson B 502 manuscript, ¶1083:

This states the king of Pictland with whom Conall Corc stayed to have been Feradach Find Fechtnach, and his daughter, Conall's first wife and Coirpre's mother, to have been Mongfind. After discussing Corc's progeny in Munster, the future Eóganachta of history, the passage concludes with:

This states that from Coirpre Cruithnechán come a sept of the Eóganachta in Alba called the Eóganacht Maige Gerginn, to whom belongs Óengus I.

Notably lacking are over two centuries of generations in Scotland. Conall Corc is said to have flourished in the early 5th century. Óengus I belongs to the 8th.

Criticism
This pedigree has been dismissed as inspired by the tales of Conall Corc. Francis John Byrne puts this in the context of the (wider) Gaelicisation of Pictland in the 9th century, and notes how later Scottish dynasties such as the Lennoxes and the House of Stuart also found Corc to be a "usefully respectable" Gaelic ancestor.

In an exhaustive criticism of the legends, David Sproule finds that the Picts are probably a literary addition, and that the Pictish king Feredach is probably inspired by Fidach, father of Crimthann mac Fidaig, who precedes Corc on the throne of Munster but is more widely known as "King of Ireland and Alba". As Mongfind is the sister of Crimthann in most Irish legends, it follows that she would be Corc's wife. Sproule also notes that a journey to Alba is common in Irish legend, and further that Feradach Finnfechtnach is the name of an earlier Irish King of Tara who has convenient associations with Alba of his own.

Feredach can also be found as the name of several figures belonging both to the Picts and Dál Riata, for example the father of Ciniod I of the Picts.

Monarchs
 Óengus I of the Picts, d. 761
 Bridei V of the Picts
 Talorgan II of the Picts, d. 782
 Drest VIII of the Picts
 Constantín mac Fergusa, d. 820
 Óengus II of the Picts, d. 834
 Drest IX of the Picts, d. 836 or 837
 Eóganan mac Óengusa, d. 839

Another member of this family may have been Domnall mac Caustantín, a possible king of Dál Riata.

Notes

References

 Francis John Byrne, Irish Kings and High-Kings. Four Courts Press. 2nd revised edition, 2001.
 Katherine Forsyth, "Evidence of a lost Pictish source in the Historia Regum Anglorum" in Simon Taylor (ed.) Kings, clerics and chronicles in Scotland, 500–1297: essays in honour of Marjorie Ogilvie Anderson on the occasion of her ninetieth birthday. Dublin: Four Courts Press, 2000. 
 Kuno Meyer (ed.), "The Laud Genealogies and Tribal Histories", in Zeitschrift für celtische Philologie 8 (1912): 291–338.
 Michael A. O'Brien (ed.) with intro. by John V. Kelleher, Corpus genealogiarum Hiberniae. DIAS. 1976. / partial digital edition: Donnchadh Ó Corráin (ed.), Genealogies from Rawlinson B 502. University College Cork: Corpus of Electronic Texts. 1997.
 David Sproule, "Origins of the Éoganachta", in Ériu 35 (1984) 31–37.
 David Sproule, "Politics and pure narrative in the stories about Corc of Cashel", in Ériu 36 (1985): 11–28.

Scottish royal houses
Pictish monarchs
Oengus
8th century in Scotland
9th century in Scotland